Home on the Range is a 1935 American drama film directed by Arthur Jacobson and starring Jackie Coogan, Randolph Scott and Evelyn Brent. Andre Sennwald of the New York Times described the film "to be a strictly makeshift Western". The supporting cast features Dean Jagger, Fuzzy Knight and Ann Sheridan (billed as "Clara Lou Sheridan").

Cast
 Jackie Coogan as Jack Hatfield
 Randolph Scott as Tom Hatfield
 Evelyn Brent as Georgia
 Dean Jagger as Thurman
 Addison Richards as Beady
 Fuzzy Knight as Cracker
 Ann Sheridan as Singer (billed as "Clara Lou Sheridan")
 Howard Wilson as Bill Morris
 Philip Morris as Benson
 Al Hart as Undertaker (as Albert Hart)
 Allen K. Wood as Flash (as Allen Wood)
 Richard Carle as Butts
 Ralph Remley as Brown
 C. L. Sherwood as Shorty (as Clarence Sherwood)
 Francis Sayles as Hotel Clerk

References

External links

1935 films
1935 drama films
American drama films
American black-and-white films
1930s American films